Rangpo Chu is a tributary of the River Rangpo, a tributary of the Teesta River in the Indian state of Sikkim. It originates near the Jelep La pass in East Sikkim district. It feeds the high-altitude Lake Menmecho. The word chu means "little river" in Tibetan.

Rivers of Sikkim
Gangtok district
Rivers of India